USS Robert E. Peary (FF-1073) was a  that saw service with the United States Navy from 1972 until 1992. In 1992, the ship was decommissioned and loaned to the Republic of China. The ship was renamed Chi Yang and served in the Taiwanese navy until 2015.

Construction 
The third US Navy warship ship named for Robert E. Peary was laid down 20 December 1970, by the Lockheed Ship Building and Drydock Company at Seattle, Washington; launched 26 June 1971; sponsored by Miss Josephine Peary; and commissioned 23 September 1972.

Design and description
The Knox-class design was derived from the  modified to extend range and without a long-range missile system. They displaced  at full load. Their crew consisted of 13 officers and 211 enlisted men.

The ships were equipped with one Westinghouse geared steam turbine that drove the single propeller shaft.

The Knox-class ships were armed with a 5"/54 caliber Mark 42 gun forward and a single 3-inch/50-caliber gun aft. They mounted an eight-round RUR-5 ASROC launcher between the 5-inch (127 mm) gun and the bridge. Close-range anti-submarine defense was provided by two twin  Mk 32 torpedo tubes. The ships were equipped with a torpedo-carrying DASH drone helicopter; its telescoping hangar and landing pad were positioned amidships aft of the mack. Beginning in the 1970s, the DASH was replaced by a SH-2 Seasprite LAMPS I helicopter and the hangar and landing deck were accordingly enlarged. Most ships also had the 3-inch (76 mm) gun replaced by an eight-cell BPDMS missile launcher in the early 1970s.

Service history
Following two months of miscellaneous tests and trials along the northern Pacific coast of the United States, she steamed into her home port at Long Beach, California, 8 November. Robert E. Peary remained in the Long Beach area for one year exactly, departing for WestPac 9 November 1973 and arriving in Subic Bay, Philippine Islands, ten days later.

Robert E. Peary was decommissioned on 7 August 1992, and loaned to the Republic of China. The destroyer escort was renamed Chi Yang by the Taiwanese Navy and served with the identification number FF-932. The vessel was commissioned into the Taiwanese Navy on 6 October 1993. On 11 November 1995 the ship was officially struck from the United States navy list. The frigate continued service until 2015, when on 1 May, Chi Yang and her sister, Hai Ying, were decommissioned at Kaohsiung. The two ships will be cannibalized for parts to keep the remaining six Knox-class vessels of the Taiwanese Navy in service.

Notes

References

External links

Navysite.de
NavSource

 

Ships built by Lockheed Shipbuilding and Construction Company
Knox-class frigates
1971 ships
Maritime incidents in 2020
Ships transferred from the United States Navy to the Republic of China Navy
Cold War frigates and destroyer escorts of the United States